The Dewar Cup Perth  was an indoor tennis event held from 1968 through 1969 and played in Perth, Scotland as part of the Dewar Cup circuit  of indoor tournaments held throughout the United Kingdom.

Results

Men's singles

Men's doubles

Women's singles

Women's doubles

References

External links
https://thetennisbase.com/Perth Results
http://www.tennisarchives.com/1969 Perth Result

Defunct tennis tournaments in the United Kingdom
Tennis tournaments in Scotland
Indoor tennis tournaments